The James A. Schlipmann Melanoma Cancer Foundation was a US-based non-profit organization with a mission to fund clinical trials and research studies, and to advance education, awareness, screenings and treatment to eventually eradicate melanoma.  The organization was founded December 15, 2002.

In 2007 the foundation awarded $160,000 in grants to fight melanoma.  Grants were awarded to Dr. Rick Kefford of the Sydney Melanoma Unit, the University of Texas Southwestern Melanoma Center, and efforts to develop resources and educational materials directed toward melanoma patients and caregivers. Since its inception, the foundation has awarded $445,000 in grants.

According to an announcement posted on the foundation's home page, the James A. Schlipmann Melanoma Cancer Foundation merged with the Charlie Guild Foundation in 2009 to create the AIM at Melanoma Foundation.

References

External links
  James A. Schlipmann Melanoma Cancer Foundation web site
 "Foundation gives $40,000 for cancer research", January 1, 2006, Quincy Herald-Whig

Cancer organizations based in the United States
Medical and health foundations in the United States
Medical and health organizations based in Texas